Kitzen is a former municipality in the Leipzig district, in Saxony, Germany. With effect from 1 January 2012, it has been incorporated into the town of Pegau.

Geography
It is located near Leipzig and includes the following subdivisions:
Eisdorf
Großschkorlopp
Hohenlohe
Kleinschkorlopp
Löben
Peißen
Scheidens
Seegel
Sittel
Thesau
Werben

References 

Former municipalities in Saxony
Leipzig (district)